Shortino is a rural locality (a village) in Kirillov Urban Settlement, Kirillovsky District, Vologda Oblast, Russia. The population was 15 as of 2002.

Geography 
Shortino is located 4 km northeast of Kirillov (the district's administrative centre) by road. Kirillov is the nearest rural locality.

References 

Rural localities in Kirillovsky District